Arrar  is a small village in Chakwal District, Punjab, Pakistan. It is located between Kallar Kahar and Choa Saiden Shah. Its Tehsil is Choa Saiden Shah. It has A Government School and the Fauji Foundation Model School Arrar.  On the East there is a village Dheri Syedan, on the west there is a village Maghal, on the north is Dharyala Kahoon, on south there is small chock named Dhatakot.

References

Populated places in Chakwal District